Bosio is a comune (municipality) in the Province of Alessandria in the Italian region Piedmont, located about  southeast of Turin and about  southeast of Alessandria.

Bosio borders the following municipalities: Campo Ligure, Campomorone, Casaleggio Boiro, Ceranesi, Gavi, Genoa, Lerma, Masone, Mele, Mornese, Parodi Ligure, Rossiglione, Tagliolo Monferrato, and Voltaggio.

Geography

The nearest point to the Ligurian Sea in Piedmont lies in the communal territory of Bosio, on Monte Biscia Mora, where the sea is just 8 km away; however, there is not a road directly connecting these locations.

See also 
 Parco naturale delle Capanne di Marcarolo

References

Cities and towns in Piedmont